Pękalski (feminine: Pękalska; plural: Pękalscy) is a Polish surname. It occasionally appears as Penkalski to indicate its pronunciation. Notable people with the surname include:

 Ivo Pękalski (born 1990), Swedish footballer
 Leszek Pękalski (born 1966), Polish serial killer

See also
 

Polish-language surnames